Paul Ragsdale (January 14, 1945 – August 14, 2011) was an American politician who served in the Texas House of Representatives from 1973 to 1987.

He died of a stroke on August 14, 2011, in Tyler, Texas at age 66.

References

1945 births
2011 deaths
Democratic Party members of the Texas House of Representatives